"Dead Girl Superstar" is a promotional single taken from Rob Zombie's second album The Sinister Urge. Zombie considered the song to be a sequel to "Living Dead Girl" from his previous album, Hellbilly Deluxe. It was also featured on the Kerrang, Vol. 3 compilation album in 2002. The song's guitar solo is played by Kerry King of Slayer fame. It is one of the few songs on the album to contain a solo. The song contains audio samples from the 1974 Isaac Hayes film Truck Turner. The song also appears in the game Warzone 2100.

An animated music video of the song can be found on Rob Zombie's website.

Personnel
 Tom Baker - Mastering
 Scott Humphrey - Producer, Programming, Mixing
 Kerry King - Guitar Solo
 Blasko - Bass
 Riggs - Guitar
 Tempesta - Drums
 Rob Zombie - Vocals, Lyricist, Producer, Art Direction

Rob Zombie songs
2001 singles
Songs written by Scott Humphrey
Songs written by Rob Zombie
2001 songs
Geffen Records singles